2-(2-Methoxyethoxy)ethanol, also known under trade names Methyl carbitol, is an industrial solvent and is also commonly used as a fuel system icing inhibitor (FSII) in jet fuels. It is a clear, colorless, hygroscopic liquid. Structurally it is an alcohol and an ether, with a formula  CH3OCH2CH2OCH2CH2OH. At direct contact it causes drying of skin by leaching fats, and is mildly irritating to the eyes. It is flammable.

See also
 Cellosolve
 2-Ethoxyethanol

External links
 Methyl Carbitol Technical Data Sheet , Dow Chemical Company

Primary alcohols
Glycol ethers
Alcohol solvents
Ether solvents